Larcombe is a surname. Notable people with the surname include:
Ethel Larcombe (artist) (1876–1940), British children's book illustrator
Ethel Thomson Larcombe (1879–1965), English tennis and badminton player
James Larcombe (1884–1957), Australian politician
Myra Larcombe (1927–2022), New Zealand swimming coach and police officer
Tom Larcombe (1881–1967), Australian cyclist